Carlos Reyes is a Puerto Rican boxer. He competed in the men's welterweight event at the 1984 Summer Olympics.

References

External links
 

Year of birth missing (living people)
Living people
Puerto Rican male boxers
Olympic boxers of Puerto Rico
Boxers at the 1984 Summer Olympics
Place of birth missing (living people)
Welterweight boxers
20th-century Puerto Rican people